William Ferguson (15 June 1852 – 20 June 1935) was a New Zealand civil engineering manager and consultant. He was born in London, England, on 15 June 1852.

References

1852 births
1935 deaths
Engineers from London
19th-century New Zealand engineers
20th-century New Zealand engineers
Moorhouse–Rhodes family